was a town located in Mii District, Fukuoka Prefecture, Japan.

As of 2003, the town had an estimated population of 17,263 and a density of 842.51 persons per km². The total area was 20.49 km².

On February 5, 2005, Kitano, along with the towns of Jōjima and Mizuma (both from Mizuma District), and the town of Tanushimaru (from Ukiha District), was merged into the expanded city of Kurume and no longer exists as an independent municipality.

External links
Kitano official website of Kurume in Japanese (with some English)

Populated places disestablished in 2005
2005 disestablishments in Japan
Dissolved municipalities of Fukuoka Prefecture
Kurume